Komang Tri Arta Wiguna (born 24 January 2001) is an Indonesian professional footballer who plays as a centre-back for Liga 1 club Bali United and the Indonesia under-23 national team.

Komang Tri was born in Madenan, Buleleng and played youth football with SSB Putra Perkanthi, PS Badung and Bali United U16s and U18s before starting his professional career with Bali United.

Club career

Bali United 
On 23 July 2020, Komang officially signed his first professional contract with Liga 1 club Bali United after being promoted from the youth team. Komang made his first-team and league debut for Bali United in a 5–0 win against Persiraja on 30 November 2021 as a substitute for Willian Pacheco in the 72nd minute.

International career
In August 2020, Tri Arta was included on Indonesia national under-19 football team 30-man list for Training Center in Croatia. He earned his first under-19 cap on 5 September 2020 in 3–0 loss against Bulgaria U19.

In October 2021, Tri Arta was called up to the Indonesia U23 in an unofficial friendly match against Tajikistan and Nepal and also prepared for 2022 AFC U-23 Asian Cup qualification in Tajikistan by Shin Tae-yong. On 26 October 2021, Tri Arta made his official international debut in an under-23 team when he came on as a substitute in a 2–3 loss against Australia U23 in the 2022 AFC U-23 Asian Cup qualification.

Career statistics

Club

Honours

Club 
Bali United
 Liga 1: 2021–22

References

External links 
 Komang Tri Arta Wiguna at PSSI
 

2001 births
Living people
Indonesian footballers
Liga 1 (Indonesia) players
Association football central defenders
Sportspeople from Bali
Bali United F.C. players
People from Buleleng Regency
Indonesia youth international footballers
Balinese people